Nicolás "Nico" Melamed Ribaudo (born 11 April 2001) is a Spanish professional footballer who plays for RCD Espanyol as a central midfielder.

Club career
Born in Castelldefels, Barcelona, Catalonia, Melamed joined RCD Espanyol's youth setup in 2013, after representing UE Cornellà and FP Atlètic Vilafranca. He made his senior debut with the reserves on 17 February 2019, starting in a 1–1 Segunda División B away draw against SD Ejea.

Melamed renewed his contract with the Pericos on 29 April 2019, signing until 2023. He scored his first senior goal on 5 May 2019, netting his team's second in a 2–0 away defeat of former side Cornellà; by doing so, he became the first player from the 21st century to score for Espanyol in any senior category.

Melamed made his professional debut on 15 August 2019, coming on as a second-half substitute for Matías Vargas in a 3–0 home defeat of FC Luzern, for the season's UEFA Europa League; he was also the first player from the 21st century to feature with the first team. He made his La Liga debut on 25 June of the following year, replacing Adri Embarba in a 1–0 away loss against Real Betis.

Definitely promoted to the main squad for the 2020–21 campaign, now in Segunda División, Melamed scored his first professional goal on 4 October 2020, in a 1–0 away win against CE Sabadell FC. He scored a further five times in 33 appearances during the season, as his side returned to the top tier.

On 31 August 2021, Melamed changed kit number to the 21 jersey, worn by former Espanyol youth graduate Daniel Jarque.

Personal life
Melamed was born in Spain and is of Argentine descent through his mother. His maternal grandfather Felipe Ribaudo (1940–1998) was an Argentine footballer who played for Estudiantes.

References

External links
Profile at the RCD Espanyol website

2001 births
Living people
People from Castelldefels
Sportspeople from the Province of Barcelona
Spanish footballers
Spain youth international footballers
Spain under-21 international footballers
Spanish people of Argentine descent
Footballers from Catalonia
Association football midfielders
La Liga players
Segunda División players
Segunda División B players
RCD Espanyol B footballers
RCD Espanyol footballers